Diplolaena cinerea, is a species of flowering plant in the family Rutaceae and is endemic to the west coast of Western Australia. It has pale orange flowers, papery, elliptic shaped leaves that are covered in star-shaped hairs on the upper surface.

Description
The leaf upperside has soft, silky, short, star-shaped hairs and moderately soft, silky and velvety on lower surface. The inner bracts are narrowly egg-shaped, slightly longer than outer bracts and densely covered with short, matted, grey hairs. Flowering occurs from July to September.

Taxonomy
This species was first formally described in 1998 by Paul G. Wilson and the description was published in the journal Nuytsia.

Distribution and habitat
Diplolaena cinerea grows mostly in woodlands on gravelly or sandy soils over laterite from  Mount Peron to Dandaragan near the west coast of Western Australia.

References

Sapindales of Australia
Rosids of Western Australia
Taxa named by Paul G. Wilson
Zanthoxyloideae